Klete Derik Keller (born March 21, 1982) is an American convicted felon and former competitive swimmer. Before retiring from swimming in 2008, Keller won five Olympic medals, including two golds, at the 2000, 2004, and 2008 Summer Olympics in the 400-meter freestyle and the 4×200-meter freestyle relay. 

In January 2021, Keller took part in the 2021 United States Capitol attack. He was later arrested and charged with three offenses stemming from his participation. He was indicted on seven charges by a grand jury the following month, and later pleaded guilty to a single charge as part of a plea bargain.

Early life
Keller was born March 21, 1982, in Las Vegas, Nevada, to mother Karen and father Kelly. Both parents were intercollegiate athletes at Arizona State University; his father played basketball and his mother swam. His older sister Kelsey swam for University of Washington, and younger sister Kalyn swam for University of Southern California (USC) and competed at the 2004 Summer Olympics.

Keller grew up in Phoenix, Arizona, and graduated from Arcadia High School in 2000.

Per the subsequent account of Jon Urbanchek, who coached Keller in his later swimming career, "he had a rough time at home". Others have corroborated that Keller had a dysfunctional home life.

Early swimming career
At the 1998 Summer Nationals, Keller was named "Rookie of the Meet". At the 1999 U.S. National Swimming Championships, Keller won bronze in the 1500m freestyle, behind Chris Thompson and Erik Vendt. Keller also competed in the 400-meter freestyle, placing fifth behind Chad Carvin, Erik Vendt, Uğur Taner, and Mark Warkentin.

Keller won gold in the 5k open water race at the 1999 Phillips 66 National Championships with a time of 46:51, earning him a spot in the same event the 1999 Pan Pacific Swimming Championships. In the 5k open water race at the 1999 Pan Pacific Swimming Championships, Keller won gold with a time of 55:42. Keller was also a member of the 1999 United States National Junior Team.

Collegiate swimming career
Keller attended the University of Southern California for two years from 2000 to 2001, but left school to focus on swimming.

While at USC, Keller won multiple individual and relay Pac-10 and NCAA Championships in the 200, 500 and 1,650-yard freestyle, as well as freestyle relays. He was a four-time NCAA champion. In both 2000 and 2001, Keller was named to the United States Swimming "All-Star Team".

Keller won at the bronze medal in the 400 meter freestyle at the 2000 Summer Olympics. Keller was one of many 2000 Olympic swimming medalists to come out of The Race Club World Team, a summer swimming camp in Florida. Also in 2000, Keller won the summer national title in the 400 meter freestyle.

In 2001, Keller won the spring national title in the 200 meter freestyle. Later that year at the World Aquatics Championships, Keller won an individual bronze medal in the 200 meter freestyle and a team bronze medal in the 4 x 200 meter freestyle relay.

Professional swimming career
Keller left USC after his sophomore season, when he went professional, forfeiting his final two years of collegiate sports eligibility. Afterwards, he trained until 2007 at Club Wolverine, run at the University of Michigan in Ann Arbor under Jon Urbanchek and later Bob Bowman. Urbanchek was the coach of the three Olympic swimming teams which Keller competed on. Late into his swimming career, Keller would cite Urbanchek as his greatest influence, remarking, "He's the type of man I want to be like when I'm older." After going professional, Keller competed in two more Summer Olympics in 2004, and 2008. Twice during his career, he was the cover athlete of Swimming World. In 2015, the Reno Gazette-Journal named Keller as the most decorated Olympian ever born in Nevada. In addition to the two times during his collegiate career, Keller, Keller was named to the United States Swimming "All-Star Team" four more times after going professional (in 2002, 2004, 2005, and 2006). Towards the end of his swimming career, Keller was reported to train for five hours every day six days per week.

At the 2002 Pan Pacific Swimming Championships, Keller won an individual bronze m medal in the 400 meter freestyle race and a team silver medal in the 4 x 200 meter freestyle relay.

At the 2002 FINA Short Course World Championships, Keller won gold in the 200 meter freestyle and the 200 400 meter freestyle, as well as bronze in the 800 meter freestyle. Keller also won the summer 2002 national title in the 400 meter freestyle and was named to the United States Swimming "All-Star Team".

At the 2003 World Aquatics championships, Keller was on the gold-winning American team in the 800 m freestyle. Keller placed fifth in the 400 meter freestyle. Keller also competed in the 200 meter freestyle, being eliminated after placing last in the semifinals. Also in 2003, Keller won the spring national title in the 400 meter freestyle. 

During the 4×200-meter freestyle relay at the Athens Summer Olympics in 2004, Keller held off a charging Ian Thorpe in the anchor leg to win the race by 0.13 seconds. This was the first time Australia had been beaten in the event in over seven years. In January 2016, Andy Ross of the magazine Swimming World named it as one of the greatest Olympic relays of all-time. The American relay of Michael Phelps, Ryan Lochte, Peter Vanderkaay, and Keller would be undefeated in competition from these Olympics onward. Vanderkaay, Larsen Jensen, Erik Vendt, and Keller made up the core of the premier American mid-distance/distance freestyle swimmers. Keller also won bronze in 400 meter freestyle. At these Olympics, Keller also placed fourth in the 200 meter freestyle. Also in 2004, Keller was named to the United States swimming "All-Star Team". 

In 2005, Keller was ranked 7th in the world in the 200m freestyle, 4th in the 400 meter freestyle, and 78th in the 100 meter freestyle. At the 2005 World Aquatics championships, Keller won a golf in the 4×200 m freestyle. That year, he won the United States summer national title in the 800 meter freestyle. In 2005, he also won the summer national title in the 400 meter freestyle and was to the United States swimming "All-Star" team. 

In his 2006 season, at the U.S. championships he achieved the top time in the world in the 400 freestyle (3:44.27). For that season, he was ranked 1st in the world in the 400 meter freestyle, 3rd for the 200 meter freestyle, and 52nd for the 100 meter freestyle. At the 2006 Pan Pacific Swimming Championships, Keller won three medals. He won gold in the 200 meter freestyle, was a member of the gold-winning United States team in the 4 x 200 meter freestyle relay, and also won bronze in the 400 meter freestyle. Keller also competed in the 100 meter freestyle (coming eleventh in the heats), and the 50 meter freestyle (coming 32nd in the heats). Also in 2006, Keller won the 2006 summer national title in the 400 meter freestyle, won bronze at the United States National Championships in the 200 meter freestyle, and was named to the United States swimming "All-Star Team".

In 2007, Keller left Ann Arbor and returned to USC to finish school and train with the Trojan Swim Club under coach Dave Salo. After returning to USC, Keller completed his bachelor degree. He had originally studying science and public policy in college, and one point in his collegiate education had been studying construction management. He ultimately received his degree in public policy and real estate development, having attended both USC and Eastern Michigan University for his college education. Keller would later recount that he had, ahead of the 2008 Summer Olympics, considered instead attending Arizona State University in order to study criminology.

In the 2007 World Rankings, Keller was ranked 18th in the 400 meter freestyle, 49th in the 200 meter freestyle, and 78th in the 100 meter freestyle. At the 2007 World Aquatics Championships, Keller was on the gold-winning team in the 4 x 200 meter freestyle relay. He also individually placed tenth in the 400 meter freestyle and 18th in the 200 meter freestyle.

At the 2008 Summer Olympics, Keller won gold in the 4 x 200 meter freestyle relay.

Post-swimming career 
Keller retired from swimming after the 2008 Summer Olympics. Keller has expressed that he had difficulty transitioning to a post-swimming professional career. In a 2014 interview, he expressed regret for not preparing ahead of time for his post-swimming career and life, saying, 

After his swimming career, Keller initially held a series of jobs in sales and finance. From October 2009 through November 2010, Keller worked at the Ann Arbor, Michigan office of Northwestern Mutual Investment Services. From June 2011 through November 2012, he worked for Multi-Bank Securities in Southfield, Michigan. In February 2013, he began working at the Memphis, Tennessee, office of Cantor Fitzgerald as a debt trader. He left the firm in February 2014. He would, in 2018, reflect on his career in sales and debt trading in an interview that, 

In an interview years later for a podcast by the Olympic Channel, Keller commented on his performance as an employee at this time, saying that he had set high expectations for himself, but had been "entitled" in the workplace, as well as a bad employee.

Since 2018, Keller has resided in Colorado Springs, Colorado. Keller began a career there as a real estate broker, being employed as an independent contractor with the real estate firm Hoff & Leigh. In 2021, when SwimSwam contacted them for their January 11 story reporting Keller's involvement in the storming of the Capitol, Hoff & Leigh confirmed that Keller was still an employee of the firm. The SwimSwam reporter that broke the story commented in their article that the firm "seemed unaware of the Capitol video or Keller's possible involvement" in the storming of the Capitol. Later that day, the firm erased all mentions of Keller from its website. On January 12, 2021, Hoff & Leigh released a statement saying that Keller no longer worked for the company, having resigned, and that they did not condone his actions. Keller returned to work with Hoff & Leigh in May 2021 according to a January 2022 SwimSwam report.

Participation in the 2021 United States Capitol attack 

Keller was identified as a participant in the 2021 United States Capitol attack, where he was seen inside the Capitol Rotunda in a crowd of people clashing with police officers. Keller's presence was reported to authorities by several people who saw a video posted by conservative outlet Townhall. Some of the people who recognized Keller in the video said that he had frequently posted pro-Donald Trump content on his social media accounts. Keller deleted his social media accounts in the immediate aftermath of being identified. Several former teammates and coaches had been among those who reportedly identified him. He was recognized, in part, because of his height, the fact that he was wearing a U.S. Olympic team jacket, and that his face was unobstructed in the video (he was not wearing a protective mask on his face despite the ongoing COVID-19 pandemic, but did have an apparent face covering hanging around his neck). Reports of his involvement in the storming were reported in the media on January 11 (with SwimSwam breaking the story).

On January 13, 2021, for his involvement in the storming of the Capitol, Keller was charged by the FBI with obstructing law enforcement engaged in official duties, unlawfully entering Capitol grounds, and disorderly conduct on Capitol grounds. For those charges, Keller originally faced up to 15.5 years in prison. Keller surrendered himself to federal authorities the following day. It was later revealed in federal court records that, the same day that Keller surrendered himself, federal agents executed a search and seizure warrant on Keller's home. Keller was released from custody the same day on a personal recognizance bond (meaning that he was released without having to make any payment). A federal judge ordered him not to travel to Washington, D.C., anytime before January 21, which was the day after the inauguration of Joe Biden. After then, the judge's orders allow him to travel to Washington, D.C., for court appearances and to meet with lawyers, but require him to ask permission before making any trips to North Carolina, where his children live. Prosecutors turned to a grand jury in order to decide if more serious charges would be warranted. On February 10, the grand jury indicted Keller on seven charges, including civil disorder, obstructing an official proceeding, entering a restricted building, disorderly conduct in a restricted building, and disorderly conduct in a Capitol building. These new charges have a maximum sentence of almost 30 years. On March 9, 2021, Keller pleaded "not guilty" on seven charges, including civil disorder and witness tampering.

On June 4, 2021, a motion was filed in United States district court by an assistant United States attorney requesting more time for ongoing discussions between Keller and prosecutors about a "potential resolution" to the case. That day, it was said by the Assistant United States Attorney in a status conference held by videoconference that, while the government had not made a formal plea offer to Keller, one might be coming "relatively quickly". In early August, a prosecutor confirmed to District Court Judge Richard J. Leon that Keller had been extended a plea offer, and that the prosecution and defense were, "finalizing an agreement". On September 1, it was reported that Keller's defense attorney had indicated that Keller was "prepared to go forward" with a plea agreement.

On September 29, 2021, as part of a plea bargain, Keller pleaded "guilty" to a felony count of obstructing an official proceeding before congress. He also pledged to cooperate with law enforcement in any continuing investigation into the attack. The sentence carries a maximum potential sentence of 20 years. In his guilty plea, he admitted to spending roughly an hour in the United States Capitol building. He admitted that, during this, he shouted expletives about Nancy Pelosi and Chuck Schumer, captured video and photographs, and "jerked his elbow" to avoid law enforcement officers that were trying to eject him from the building. He admitted that he later destroyed a phone and a memory card which he had brought with him to the capitol, and had thrown away the jacket he wore during his participation.

As of December 2022, Keller remains free on bond pending his sentencing. He faces 21 to 27 months in prison.

Personal life
Ahead of the 2004 Summer Olympics, Keller reportedly suffered a period of insomnia and malaise, which resulted in an "emotional breakdown".

In 2008, ahead of the Olympics, Keller became engaged to wed Cari Carr. The two married and had three children. Jon Urbanchek was one of the groomsmen at his wedding. Keller and Carr ultimately divorced.  The two of them went through a custody dispute during their divorce.

In 2018, Keller revealed that in January 2014, after going through both his divorce and becoming unemployed, he had become homeless and lived out of his car for roughly ten months. He also said that, for four years, he lacked visitation rights with his children, making him unable to see them, despite living only minutes away from them. In an interview he conducted in the spring of 2014, he stated that he was no longer certain of the whereabouts of three of his Olympic medals. In the same 2014 interview, Keller also said that he had failed to find similar successes in his endeavors after retiring from swimming. He said that he made the mistake of not having the foresight to plan for his post-swimming career, and felt somewhat "bitter" both towards himself and his sport. He expressed regret for having continued swimming for another four years after the 2004 Olympics, saying that he believed, in retrospect, that he should have retired after the 2004 Summer Olympics and gone back to school thereafter.

In 2018, Keller credited his sister Kalyn with having assisted him with what he saw as a personal comeback from his low-point of homelessness, saying that she had taken him in. During this period he made a living by teaching swimming lessons and operating swim clinics. Keller also resided with his grandmother at one point around this time.

Around the time he moved to Colorado Springs, Keller regained visitation with his children. , Keller's children lived in North Carolina, and he was still visiting with them.

In August 2018, Keller was in the news for an incident in which a dog sitter he had hired hosted a threesome in his house without permission from Keller. Keller walked into his house to find strangers in a state of undress.

Keller has admitted that his immediate family is "not close", and, in 2021, Sports Illustrated reported that sources familiar with his family have declared a belief Keller and his parents have been estranged since 2004.

It was reported in early 2021 that Keller was engaged.

Following his participation in the storming of the United States Capitol, friends of Keller's described him as a strong political conservative and a gun enthusiast, who had expressed increasingly strong support for Donald Trump on his social media in the previous years, particularly in the year immediately prior. He had previously attended the "Million MAGA March", a pro-Trump 2020–21 United States election protest held in Washington, D.C., in late November 2020. After Keller's participation in the storming of the Capitol, his ex-wife, by then known as Cari Car Sherrill, stated that she no longer had a personal relationship with Keller, and remarked that she believed that "during and since his swimming career, he's had many personal issues he's chosen not to address".

See also
 List of Olympic medalists in swimming (men)
 List of University of Southern California people
 List of World Aquatics Championships medalists in swimming (men)
 World record progression 4 × 200 metres freestyle relay

References

External links
 

1982 births
Convicted participants in the January 6 United States Capitol attack
Living people
American male freestyle swimmers
American people of German descent
Eastern Michigan University alumni
Medalists at the 2000 Summer Olympics
Medalists at the 2004 Summer Olympics
Medalists at the 2008 Summer Olympics
Medalists at the FINA World Swimming Championships (25 m)
Olympic bronze medalists for the United States in swimming
Olympic gold medalists for the United States in swimming
Olympic silver medalists for the United States in swimming
Sportspeople from Phoenix, Arizona
Swimmers at the 2000 Summer Olympics
Swimmers at the 2004 Summer Olympics
Swimmers at the 2008 Summer Olympics
USC Trojans men's swimmers
World Aquatics Championships medalists in swimming
World record setters in swimming